The 1976–77 Indianapolis Racers season was the Racers' third season of operation in the World Hockey Association.

Offseason

Regular season

Final standings

Game log

Playoffs

Indianapolis Racers 4, Cincinnati Stingers 0 – Division Quarterfinals

Quebec Nordiques 4, Indianapolis Racers 1 – Division Semifinals

Player stats

Note: Pos = Position; GP = Games played; G = Goals; A = Assists; Pts = Points; +/- = plus/minus; PIM = Penalty minutes; PPG = Power-play goals; SHG = Short-handed goals; GWG = Game-winning goals
      MIN = Minutes played; W = Wins; L = Losses; T = Ties; GA = Goals-against; GAA = Goals-against average; SO = Shutouts;

Awards and records

Transactions

Draft picks
Indianapolis's draft picks at the 1976 WHA Amateur Draft.

Farm teams

See also
1976–77 WHA season

References

External links

Ind
Ind
Indianapolis Racers seasons